Angelique Samantha Taai (born 31 March 1987) is a South African former cricketer and current cricket coach. She played as a right-arm medium-fast bowler and right-handed batter, as well as occasionally keeping wicket. She appeared in 13 One Day Internationals and seven Twenty20 Internationals for South Africa between 2005 and 2010. She played domestic cricket for Border.

She is the current Head Coach of KwaZulu-Natal Coastal and Thistles.

References

External links
 
 

1987 births
Living people
South African women cricketers
South Africa women One Day International cricketers
South Africa women Twenty20 International cricketers
Sportspeople from Qonce
Border women cricketers
East Coast women cricketers
South African cricket coaches